Bradford is a village in Stark County, Illinois, United States. The population was 768 at the 2010 census. Bradford is part of the Peoria, Illinois Metropolitan Statistical Area.

Geography
Bradford is located at  (41.176884, -89.659445).

Demographics

As of the census of 2000, there were 787 people, 318 households, and 225 families residing in the village. The racial makeup of the village was 98.73% White, 0.13% Native American, 0.51% Asian, 0.51% from other races, and 0.13% from two or more races. Hispanic or Latino of any race were 1.02% of the population.

There were 318 households, out of which 32.4% had children under the age of 18 living with them, 57.5% were married couples living together, 9.7% had a female householder with no husband present, and 29.2% were non-families. 27.7% of all households were made up of individuals, and 17.0% had someone living alone who was 65 years of age or older. The average household size was 2.47 and the average family size was 2.96.

In the village, the population was spread out, with 27.2% under the age of 18, 6.7% from 18 to 24, 24.9% from 25 to 44, 23.6% from 45 to 64, and 17.5% who were 65 years of age or older. The median age was 38 years. For every 100 females, there were 86.9 males. For every 100 females age 18 and over, there were 81.9 males.

The median income for a household in the village was $33,750, and the median income for a family was $41,000. Males had a median income of $35,333 versus $21,324 for females. The per capita income for the village was $16,279. About 6.2% of families and 9.8% of the population were below the poverty line, including 11.4% of those under age 18 and 9.8% of those age 65 or over.

Education
From the mid-19th century there was St. John Catholic Grade School which was closed in 1968. 
Bradford School District now has two schools in the village, Bradford Jr. High and Bradford Grade School. Bradford High School was deactivated in 2001 and now houses the Jr. High. The high school students have their choice of attending one of two high schools: Stark County High School, or Bureau Valley High School.

Boy Scout Troop 1851 is in Bradford.

Notable people
 Eva Katherine Clapp (1857-1916), writer of novels, short stories, and poems
 C. W. Whitten, educator and athletic administrator, was born near Bradford.

References

External links
 Village of Bradford, Illinois - Official Website

Villages in Stark County, Illinois
Villages in Illinois
Peoria metropolitan area, Illinois